The 1868 Brazilian political crisis led to the resignation of the ruling Progressive cabinet and the return of the Conservative Party to power in the Empire of Brazil.

Background

Progressive League

War effort and slavery abolition

1868 political crisis

Caxias–Zacarias clash

Progressive cabinet resignation

Aftermath

See also 

 Politics of the Empire of Brazil

Footnotes

References 

 
 
 
 
 
 

Empire of Brazil
Political crisis
Brazilian crisis